1573 Väisälä, provisional designation , is a stony Phocaea asteroid, slow rotator and suspected tumbler from the inner regions of the asteroid belt, approximately 9 kilometers in diameter. It was discovered on 27 October 1949, by Belgian astronomer Sylvain Arend at the Royal Observatory of Belgium in Uccle, Belgium. It was named for Finnish astronomer Yrjö Väisälä.

Orbit and classification 

The stony S-type asteroid is a member of the Phocaea family, a group of asteroids with similar orbital characteristics. It orbits the Sun at a distance of 1.8–2.9 AU once every 3 years and 8 months (1,334 days). Its orbit has an eccentricity of 0.23 and an inclination of 25° with respect to the ecliptic. Väisäläs observation arc begins on the night following its official discovery observation at Uccle, as no precoveries were taken and no prior identifications were made.

Physical characteristics

Slow rotator 

In September 2011, a rotational lightcurve of Väisälä was obtained from photometric observations made by Czech astronomer Petr Pravec at Ondřejov Observatory. Its analysis gave a rotation period of 252 hours with a brightness variation of 0.76 magnitude. This makes Väisälä one of the Top 200 slow rotators known to exist. The body is also suspected to be in a non-principal axis rotation (NPAR), colloquially called as "tumbling". As of 2017, no follow-up observations have been made of these provisional results.

Diameter and albedo 

According to the space-based surveys carried out by the Infrared Astronomical Satellite IRAS, and NASA's Wide-field Infrared Survey Explorer with its subsequent NEOWISE mission, Väisälä measures between 8.43 and 9.77 kilometers in diameter, and its surface has an albedo between 0.222 and 0.284. The Collaborative Asteroid Lightcurve Link adopts the results obtained by IRAS, that is, an albedo of 0.2226 and a diameter of 9.77 kilometers using on an absolute magnitude of 12.30.

Naming 

This minor planet was named after Finnish astronomer, Yrjö Väisälä (1891–1971), a prolific discoverer of minor planets during the late 1930s and early 1940s. In addition, a second minor planet, 2804 Yrjö, was named in his honor by pioneering Finnish female astronomer Liisi Oterma, and the lunar crater Väisälä also bears his name. The official  was published by the Minor Planet Center on 31 January 1962.

Notets

References

External links 
 Asteroid Lightcurve Database (LCDB), query form (info )
 Dictionary of Minor Planet Names, Google books
 Asteroids and comets rotation curves, CdR – Observatoire de Genève, Raoul Behrend
 Discovery Circumstances: Numbered Minor Planets (1)-(5000) – Minor Planet Center
 
 

001573
Discoveries by Sylvain Arend
Named minor planets
001573
19491027